Jancis Mary Robinson OBE, ComMA, MW (born 22 April 1950) is a British wine critic, journalist and wine writer. She currently writes a weekly column for the Financial Times, and writes for her website JancisRobinson.com, updated daily. She provided advice for the wine cellar of Queen Elizabeth II.

Early life and education
Robinson was born in Carlisle, Cumbria, studied mathematics and philosophy at St Anne's College, University of Oxford, and worked for a travel company after leaving university; according to her website, she worked in marketing for Thomson Holidays.

Career
Robinson started her wine writing career on 1 December 1975 when she became assistant editor for the trade magazine Wine & Spirit. In 1984, she became the first person outside the wine trade to become a Master of Wine. From 1995 until she resigned in 2010 she served as British Airways' wine consultant, and supervised the BA Concorde cellar luxury selection.

As a wine writer, she has become one of the world's leading writers of educational and encyclopedic material on wine and was described by Decanter as "the most respected wine critic and journalist in the world". The Oxford Companion to Wine, edited by Robinson, is widely considered to be the most comprehensive wine encyclopedia in the world. The first edition was published in 1994, and took five years to write after she was signed on as editor in 1988. In addition, The World Atlas of Wine by Hugh Johnson and Robinson is one of the world's leading wine atlases.

In 1995, Robinson appeared in a 10-episode wine course on BBC 2 television. This series was later reissued on DVD. A book titled Jancis Robinson's Wine Course was written to accompany the series and has gone through several editions. In 2015 she launched an online wine course, "Mastering Wine – Shortcuts to Success" on udemy. In 2022 she launched "An Understanding of Wine", an exclusive online course for BBC Maestro.

She has an honorary doctorate from the Open University, and was made an OBE in 2003, among numerous other awards for her writing. Her accolades include multiple Glenfiddich Awards and André Simon Memorial Awards, and a selection as the Decanter "1999 Woman of the Year". In 2016, she was made an Officier de l'Ordre du Mérite Agricole, was given the German VDP association's highest honour and won for fourth James Beard Award in the US.

Following a difference of opinion with Robert Parker over the 2003 vintage of Château Pavie, the following media coverage frequently described a "war of words" between the two critics. Less dramatic than the predominant press view, Robinson and Parker as of 2008 had a cordial relationship.

In 2012, Allen Lane (Penguin) in the UK and Ecco in the US published a 1,200-page book called Wine Grapes co-authored by Robinson with Julia Harding MW and Jose Vouillamoz which won every major wine book award. The book provides comprehensive details on 1,368 vine varieties and won six major wine book awards.

In 2018, Jancis appeared in the film SOMM 3 to taste some of the world's finest wines and discuss the Judgment of Paris (wine) with some of the world's most respected wine figures including the late Steven Spurrier (wine merchant).

Robinson is married to the food writer Nick Lander, author of The Art of the Restaurateur; they have three children, Julia, William and Rose.

Honours
 Officer of the Order of the British Empire, United Kingdom (2003)
 Officer of the Order of Agricultural Merit, France (2010)
 Commander of the Order of Entrepreneurial Merit (Category of Agricultural Merit), Portugal (2011)

Bibliography

See also
List of wine personalities

References

External links
 Jancis Robinson's Purple Pages
 Jancis Robinson articles in Financial Times
 Podcast of Jancis Robinson discussing "Writing about wine" at the Shanghai International Literary Festival
 Live blogging interview with Jancis Robinson
 Interview with Jancis Robinson

1950 births
British women journalists
British television presenters
Living people
Masters of Wine
Officers of the Order of the British Empire
Wine critics
Wine writers
Alumni of St Anne's College, Oxford
James Beard Foundation Award winners
20th-century British journalists
20th-century British women writers
21st-century British journalists
21st-century British women writers